S Crucis is a star in the constellation Crux. It is a yellow-white supergiant that pulsates between spectral types F6Ib-II and G1Ib-II.

S Crucis is a pulsating variable star of the δ Cephei type, a Classical Cepheid variable. The star is thought to be 116 million years old; it has exhausted its core hydrogen and left the main sequence.

References

Crux (constellation)
Classical Cepheid variables
Crucis, S
Durchmusterung objects
112044
062986
4895
F-type bright giants
F-type supergiants
G-type supergiants
G-type bright giants